The Mazarn Shale is an Early Ordovician geologic formation in the Ouachita Mountains of Arkansas and Oklahoma. This interval was first described in 1892, but remained unnamed until 1918 as part of a study by U.S. Geological Survey geologist Hugh Dinsmore Miser.

Paleofauna

Graptolites

 Caryocaris
 C. wrighti
 Cryptograptus
 C. antennarius
 Didymograptus
 D. caduceus
 D. caduceus nana
 D. extensus
 D. filiformis
 D. nitidus
 D. similis
 Diplograptus
 Glossograptus
 G. hystrix
 Mesograptus
 Phyllograptus
 P. typus
 Retiograptus
 Tetragraptus 
 T. clarkei
 T. fruticosus
 T. quadribrachiatus
 T. pendens
 T. serra
 T. similis

See also

 List of fossiliferous stratigraphic units in Arkansas
 Paleontology in Arkansas

References

Ordovician geology of Oklahoma
Ordovician Arkansas
Ordovician southern paleotropical deposits